William Joseph Folk (July 11, 1927 – April 21, 1976) was a Canadian professional ice hockey defenceman who played 12 games in the National Hockey League for the Detroit Red Wings during the 1951–52 and 1952–53 seasons. The rest of his career, which lasted from 1947 to 1966, was spent in the minor leagues.

He died after a long illness in 1976, at the age of 48.

Career statistics

Regular season and playoffs

References

External links
 

1927 births
1976 deaths
Boston Olympics players
Canadian ice hockey defencemen
Detroit Red Wings players
Edmonton Flyers (WHL) players
Ice hockey people from Saskatchewan
Indianapolis Capitals players
Omaha Knights (USHL) players
Providence Reds players
Saskatoon Quakers players
Spokane Comets players
Sportspeople from Regina, Saskatchewan
Vancouver Canucks (WHL) players
Winnipeg Warriors (minor pro) players